Somewhere is a multi-disciplinary UK-based creative organisation founded in 2001 by the artists and film-makers Karen Guthrie (born 1970) and Nina Pope (born 1968).

After studying together at Edinburgh College of Art, Pope and Guthrie completed MAs in London and began collaborating as artists in 1995, with their installation "Somewhere Over the TV" at the Collective Gallery in Edinburgh, followed by their live online travelogue "A Hypertext Journal" in March 1996.

Somewhere has long-term collaborators including the composer Tim Olden and the technologist Dorian Moore. In 2007, Guthrie and Pope won the first Northern Art Prize.

Works

The Floating Cinema
In 2010/11, Somewhere was appointed as guest artists to programme and create content for the Floating Cinema, part of Up Projects' Portavilion series of temporary cultural spaces for London. Housed in a customised narrowboat designed by the architects Studio Weave, the Floating Cinema was an Olympic Development Authority commission taking place across summer 2011 on the canals in the East End of London. Guest speakers and performers aboard included the Olympic polemicist Iain Sinclair, the broadcaster Michael Smith (who premiered his first film as director, Drift Street, aboard) and the nature writer Richard Mabey.

The project was recommissioned by the Legacy List (the charity leading the transformation of the former 2012 Olympic Park) to relaunch in 2013 with a new vessel designed by the London architects Duggan Morris.

Jaywick Escapes
The third feature documentary produced and directed by Guthrie and Pope was also shot by the directors, in 2010/11. This atmospheric and poignant film follows the stories of a handful of residents of the blighted seaside town of Jaywick in Essex, cited in government statistics as Britain's most deprived place. The film was premiered at the Sheffield Doc/Fest in summer 2012.

What Will the Harvest Be?
In 2008, Somewhere gained a major public commission from the London Borough of Newham to rejuvenate a barren site with Scheduled Ancient Monument Status close to the site of the 2012 Olympics in East London. The resulting proposal - What Will the Harvest Be? - became a major project to create an unregulated, publicly accessible harvest garden where anyone could grow and harvest vegetables and flowers. Working with an active residents' group, Friends of Abbey Gardens (FOAG), from spring 2009, the ruins of 19th-century housing and a medieval Cistercian gatehouse were stabilised and protected, and the plot was transformed with bespoke raised beds offering 1,000 linear metres of growing space. The garden design was influenced by historical research (e.g. the Plaistow Landgrabbers' Triangle Camp and the legacy of Cistercian gardens) and includes many specially designed elements which create a spectacular public space. What Will the Harvest Be? was initiated as a temporary site-specific project, and Somewhere also created a permanent design for the site. There are no plans to implement the permanent scheme. FOAG now manages the garden, holding diverse events for the community and visitors.

Living with the Tudors
The culmination of four years spent incognito within the UK historical re-enactment scene, "Living with the Tudors" is a documentary feature film shot entirely inside the 2007 Tudor (16th century) "re-creation" at Kentwell Hall in rural Suffolk. Among the 500 volunteers spending their summer holidays re-creating every aspect of 16th century English life, the film meets a core of loyal and protective re-enactors whose real-life stories form a fascinating counterpoint to their chosen Tudor roles. Shepherding through the thousands of paying visitors who keep Kentwell afloat is its owner, Patrick Phillips, a distantly paternal leader who describes the epic spectacles as his "game".

Bata-ville: We are not afraid of the future
In 2005, Somewhere co-produced Pope and Guthrie's first feature film, the unorthodox documentary travelogue Bata-ville: We are not afraid of the future, which was selected for the 2005 Edinburgh International Film Festival and has since become something of a cult success. The film follows a group of former Bata Shoes factory workers travelling from the UK to Zlin in the Czech Republic on a free coach trip hosted by the artists. The film sees them visit the origins of the global shoe empire built up by the early 20th century Czech entrepreneur Tomas Bata, in search of what his maxim "We are not afraid of the future" can mean in a changing Europe. The film originated in a commission by the agency Commissions East and the project has since become a benchmark for the contemporary public art genre. Bata-ville has been shown in many festivals and art venues, including at Tate Britain, SXSW Festival (Austin, Texas) 2006 and the Zlin Film Festival 2006.

TV swansong
In 2002, Somewhere produced the innovative media art project "TV swansong", the first live UK-based webcast of artists' projects commissioned specifically for the World-Wide Web, which took as its subject the demise of television in the age of convergent media. Featured artists were Graham Fagen, Jordan Baseman, Jessica Voorsanger, Zoe Walker and Neil Bromwich, Rory Hamilton and Jon Rogers, Chris Helson, Giorgio Sadotti.

/broadcast/ (29 pilgrims, 29 tales)
In 1999, Pope and Guthrie organised a contemporary version of Geoffrey Chaucer's The Canterbury Tales, which was 1999's Tate Modern (Bankside) Annual Event.

For this event, they chose 29 people to act as pilgrims and, on 11 September, they broadcast the pilgrims'stales live in Borough Market in Southwark, as well as webcasting them from this site onto the Internet. The website is now a record of the day's events, containing all the pilgrims' tales and prologues. The website contains an index, "The order of the day" and there a link to each pilgrim's home page, with details of the journeys they made to their chosen destinations within the project's 24-hour period.

The contributors tales were as follows: The Fisherman's Tale, The Poet's Tale, The Artist's Tale, Interlude, The Management Consultant's Tale, The Tarot Reader's Tale, The Parishioner's Tale, The Scientist's Tale, Interlude, The Van Driver's Tale, The Analysand's Tale, The Friend's Tale, The Punter's Tale, The Counsellor's Tale, The Nun's Tale, The Fiddle Maker's Tale, The Phototherapist's Tale, The Writer's Tale, Interlude, The Scholar's Tale, The Diver's Tale, The Environmental Manager's Tale, Interlude, The Passenger's Tale, The Shopper's Tale and The Dilettante's Tale.

At the end of the 24 hours, there was a feast when all the pilgrims met at Borough Market, ate and talked about their experiences.

Other works
Other works include:
 The Festival of Lying, Grizedale Show, Cumbria, in collaboration with Anna Best and Simon Poulter (2000)
 A Fair Place, British Council Group show, Nouvelles Peripheries, Istanbul, Turkey (2001)
 Seven Samurai, site-specific project for the Echigo-Tsumari Triennale, Japan, curated by Grizedale Arts
 Sometime Later, commissioned by the BBC and Arts Council England, a web/film project (2005/6)
 Almanac, site-specific permanent commission for Cinema City in Norwich (2007)

References

External links
 Somewhere's official site
 Floating Cinema project site
  What Will the Harvest Be? site
 Living with the Tudors official film website
 Broadcast (29 pilgrims, 29 tales) Tate Annual Event Borough Market – 11 September 1999, Tate Online press release (1999)
 The Festival of Lying", Grizedale Show, Cumbria (2000)
 Bata-ville: We are not afraid of the future:
 somewhere.org.uk/bata-ville / Bata-ville official film website
 Review of Bata-ville on BBC News 
 
 Review of Bata-ville on Variety.com
 Review of Bata-ville on Telegraph.co.uk
 Article about Bata-ville on Radio Praha 

2001 establishments in the United Kingdom
British artist groups and collectives
Arts organisations based in the United Kingdom
New media
Somewhere